Mercieca is a surname. Notable people with the surname include:

Arturo Mercieca (1878–1963), Maltese judge
Grazio Mercieca, Maltese judge
Joseph Mercieca (1928–2016), Maltese Roman Catholic archbishop
Silvio Mercieca (1888–1954), Maltese architect
Tamra Mercieca (born 1980), Australian author and therapist
Jennifer Mercieca (born 1971), American rhetorical scholar

References